Fred Stevens was a British former Grand Prix motorcycle road racer. His best season was in 1965 when he finished the year in fourth place in the 500cc world championship.  

In 1967, Stevens rode an Italian Paton motorcycle to win the 350cc and 500cc races at the North West 200 race in Northern Ireland and, twice finished on the podium at the Isle of Man TT.

References 

British motorcycle racers
125cc World Championship riders
250cc World Championship riders
350cc World Championship riders
500cc World Championship riders
Isle of Man TT riders
Year of birth missing (living people)
Living people
Place of birth missing (living people)